808 may refer to:

Music
 Roland TR-808, a drum machine
 808 (film), a documentary about the Roland TR-808
 808 State, British electronic group
 808s & Heartbreak, the fourth studio album by American Hip hop artist Kanye West
 808 (album), a 2011 album by Taiwanese Mandopop artist Wilber Pan
"808" (Blaque song), a 1999 single by American R&B group Blaque
 "808" (Jane Zhang song), a 2017 song by Chinese singer-songwriter Jane Zhang

Other
 808 (number)
 808 BC
 AD 808, a year in the Gregorian calendar
 Area code 808, the North American Numbering Plan area code for the U.S. state of Hawaii
 Nokia 808 PureView, a smartphone
 Nobel 808, an early plastic explosive of World War II